"The Human Abstract" is a poem written by the English poet William Blake.  It was published as part of his collection Songs of Experience in 1794. The poem was originally drafted in Blake's notebook and was later revised for as part of publication in Songs of Experience. Critics of the poem have noted it as demonstrative of Blake's metaphysical poetry and its emphasis on the tension between the human and the divine.

Poem

Context and interpretation
The poem was engraved on a single plate as a part of the Songs of Experience (1794) and reprinted in Gilchrist's Life of Blake in the second volume 1863/1880 from the draft in the Notebook of William Blake (p. 107 reversed, see the example on the right), where the first title of the poem The Earth was erased and The human Image substituted. The title The Human Abstract appeared first in the Songs of Innocence and of Experience. In the commentary to his publication of the Songs of Innocence and of Experience, D. G. Rossetti described this poem as one  of "very perfect and noble examples of Blake's metaphysical poetry".

The illustration shows a gowned old man with a long beard who kneels with his legs outspread. He raises his arms to grip the ropes as if he tries to free himself. There is a tree trunk with a broad base on the right and the edge of another on the left. The colour of the sky suggests sunrise or sunset. A muddy river runs along the lower edge of the design in front of the  man. The picture portrays the supreme God of Blake's mythology and the creator of the material world, whom Blake named "Urizen" (probably from your reason), struggling with his own nets of religion, under the Tree of Mystery, which symbolically "represents the resulting growth of religion and the priesthood (the Catterpillar and the Fly), feeding on its leaves". 
 
The previous title of the poem "The Human Image" shows clearly that it is a counterpart to "The Divine Image" in the Songs of Innocence. There is a great difference between two worlds: of Innocence and of Experience. In "The Divine Image" of Innocence Blake establishes four great virtues: mercy, pity, peace, and love, where the last one is the greatest and embraces the other three. These four virtues represent God as well as a Man:

However, as Robert F. Gleckner  pointed out, “in the world of experience such a human-divine imaginative unity is shattered, for the Blakean fall, as is well known, is a fall into division, fragmentation, each fragment assuming for itself the importance (and hence the benefits) of the whole. Experience, then, is fundamentally hypocritical and acquisitive, rational and non-imaginative. In such a world virtue cannot exist except as a rationally conceived opposite to vice.”

Blake made two more attempts to create a counterpart poem to The Divine Image of Innocence. One of them, A Divine Image, was clearly intended for Songs of Experience, and was even etched, but not included into the main corpus of the collection: 

There are the explicit antitheses in this poem and The Divine Image of the Songs of Innocence.  "The poem's discursiveness, its rather mechanical, almost mathematical simplicity make it unlike other songs of experience; the obviousness of the contrast suggests a hasty, impulsive composition..."

The four virtues of The Divine Image (mercy, pity, peace, and love) that incorporated the human heart, face, form, and dress were abstracted here from the corpus of the divine, become selfish and hypocritically disguise their true natures, and perverted into cruelty, jealousy, terror, and secrecy.

Another poem dealing with the same subject "I heard an Angel singing..." exists only in draft version and appeared as the eighth entry of Blake's Notebook, p. 114, reversed, seven pages and about twenty poems before "The Human Image" (that is the draft of "The Human Abstract"). "Blake's intention in 'The Human Abstract' then was to analyze the perversion while making it clear at the same time that imaginatively (to the poet) it was a perversion, rationally (to fallen man) it was not. In 'A Divine Image' he had simply done the former. 'I heard an Angel singing...' was his first attempt to do both, the angel speaking for 'The Divine Image', the devil for 'A Divine Image'":
  

In a draft version of "The Human Abstract" (under the title "The human Image") the word "Pity" of the first line is written instead of the word "Mercy". The second line "If we did not make somebody poor" in the first version was written above the struck-through line "If there was nobody poor". 

In the second stanza the word "baits" is a replacement of the deleted word "nets":

Third, fourth and fifth stanzas arranged exactly as in the last etched version, however with no punctuation marks:
 

The last quatrain of the poem is the replacement of the following passage:
 

As was observed by the scholars, the ideas of the poem correspond with some other works of Blake which show deeper insight. For example:

Here is the mentioned fragment from Chap: III of The Book of Ahania:

Sampson noticed that "the 'Tree of Mystery' signifies 'Moral Law'", and cited the relevant passage from Blake's Jerusalem The Emanation of the Giant Albion:

Gleckner concluded his analysis with the statement that the poem "The Human Abstract", as a whole, is “a remarkably ambitious experiment in progressive enrichment, and a revealing document for the study of Blake's two contrary states of the human soul.”

Musical settings
 David A. Axelrod (b.1931), USA: The human abstract. No. 6 from Songs of Experience, for orchestra. Rec. Capitol stereo SKAO-338 (1969) 
 Timothy Lenk (b. 1952), USA: The human abstract. No. 12 from Songs of Innocence and of Experience, for tenor and bass soli, flute (piccolo), clarinet (and bass clarinet) and violin, 1977
 Gerard Victory (1921 –1995), Ireland: The human abstract. No. 5 from Seven Songs of Experience, for soprano and tenor soli, and SATB a capella, 1977/78
 Mike Westbrook (b. 1936), UK: The human abstract, for jazz ensemble and singing, Rec. 1983
 William Brocklesby Wordsworth (1908 –1988), UK: Pity would be no more (The human abstract), No. 4 from A Vision, for women's voices (SSA), strings and piano, Op. 46 (1950)

See also
 The Human Abstract (song)
 The Human Abstract (band) (metal band)

Notes

References

Works cited

 
 

 

 Swinburne, A. C. William Blake, a critical essay (Chapter: Lyrical poems), 1868.

External links

A comparison of extant copies of The Human Abstract: from the William Blake Archive.

1794 poems
Songs of Innocence and of Experience